Giannis Plakiotakis (born 10 July 1968) is a Greek politician who served as the acting President of New Democracy following the resignation of Vangelis Meimarakis. He has been a Member of the Hellenic Parliament (MP) for Lasithi since 2004.

Early life and education

Plakiotakis was born in Athens and studied biochemical engineering at the University of Wales. He then completed a Master's degree in biochemical engineering at the University of London before completing another master's degree in business administration at City University London.

Political career

Plakiotakis has been a member of New Democracy since 1987. He was a municipal advisor for the Sitia municipality from 1990 to 2002. He was first elected as a New Democracy Member of the Hellenic Parliament for Lasithi in 2004, being re-elected in every election since.

In October 2007, Plakiotakis was appointed as a Deputy Minister for National Defence. In 2015, he was the secretary of the New Democracy parliamentary group.

On 24 November 2015, Vangelis Meimarakis appointed Plakiotakis as a Vice President of New Democracy whilst he considered whether or not to resign. Later that day, Meimarakis resigned, appointing Plakiotakis as the interim President of the party until the conclusion of the New Democracy leadership election.

References

|-

1968 births
Greek MPs 2004–2007
Greek MPs 2007–2009
Greek MPs 2009–2012
Greek MPs 2012 (May)
Greek MPs 2012–2014
Greek MPs 2015 (February–August)
Greek MPs 2015–2019
Greek MPs 2019–2023
Leaders of New Democracy (Greece)
Living people
New Democracy (Greece) politicians
Politicians from Athens
Greek biochemists
Alumni of the University of Wales
Alumni of City, University of London